Soleneiscus is a genus of calcareous sponges in the family Dendyidae.

Species
According to WORMS, accepted species in the genus are:
Soleneiscus apicalis (Brøndsted, 1931)
Soleneiscus hamatus Voigt, Erpenbeck & Wörheide, 2017
Soleneiscus hispidus (Brøndsted, 1931)
Soleneiscus irregularis (Jenkin, 1908)
Soleneiscus japonicus (Haeckel, 1872)
Soleneiscus olynthus (Borojevic & Boury-Esnault, 1987)
Soleneiscus pedicellatus Azevedo, Cóndor-Luján, Willenz, Hajdu, Hooker & Klautau, 2015
Soleneiscus radovani Wörheide & Hooper, 1999
Soleneiscus stolonifer (Dendy, 1891)

References

Clathrinida
Taxa named by Nicole Boury-Esnault
Taxa named by Jean Vacelet